"Funky Man" is a single by Dee Dee King, the rapper alias of Ramones bassist Dee Dee Ramone. It was released as a 12-inch single by Profile Records imprint Rock Hotel Records, with the b-side being an extended dub version of the song. The cover art work was by James Rizzi.

The single was recorded after Ramone was in a drug treatment center where he was introduced to rap. He was still in the Ramones when it was released, although he left the band in 1989 and then released a full album under his King alias, Standing in the Spotlight.

Track listing
 "Funky Man" – 4:48
 "Funky Man (Dub)" – 6:50

References

1987 singles
Dee Dee Ramone songs
Songs written by Dee Dee Ramone
1987 songs